Talisson Henrique Glock (born 13 February 1995) is a Brazilian Paralympic swimmer. He represented Brazil at the Summer Paralympics in 2016 and in 2021. In total, he won one gold medal, one silver medal and three bronze medals.

Career 

In 2011, he represented Brazil at the Parapan American Games held in Guadalajara, Mexico. He won the gold medal in the men's 100 metre backstroke S6 event. Four years later, he won several medals at the 2015 Parapan American Games held in Toronto, Canada.

He represented Brazil at the 2016 Summer Paralympics in Rio de Janeiro, Brazil and he won the bronze medal in the men's 200 metre individual medley SM6 event.

In 2018, he broke the national record in the men's 50 metre butterfly twice at the World Para Swimming World Series in São Paulo, Brazil, both in the heats and in the final.

References

External links 

 

Living people
1995 births
People from Joinville
Brazilian male backstroke swimmers
Brazilian male butterfly swimmers
Brazilian male freestyle swimmers
Brazilian male medley swimmers
Swimmers at the 2016 Summer Paralympics
Swimmers at the 2020 Summer Paralympics
Medalists at the 2016 Summer Paralympics
Medalists at the 2020 Summer Paralympics
Paralympic gold medalists for Brazil
Paralympic bronze medalists for Brazil
Paralympic medalists in swimming
Paralympic swimmers of Brazil
Medalists at the World Para Swimming Championships
Medalists at the 2011 Parapan American Games
Medalists at the 2015 Parapan American Games
Medalists at the 2019 Parapan American Games
S6-classified Paralympic swimmers
Sportspeople from Santa Catarina (state)
Brazilian people of German descent
21st-century Brazilian people